Shannon Noelle Bream ( DePuy; born December 23, 1970) is an American journalist and attorney who appears on Fox News Channel. In 2022 she became the host of the program Fox News Sunday.  Prior to hosting Fox News Sunday she was the host of Fox News @ Night for five years. She was also a former contestant in the Miss America 1991 and Miss USA 1995 pageants. Bream was also a correspondent for NEWS 12 Long Island in the 1990s.

Biography
Bream is the daughter of Linda (née Evans) and Clarence Edward DePuy. She began study at Liberty University in Lynchburg, Virginia when she was 17 years old and, during her college years, won the pageant title Miss Virginia in 1990. She then participated and finished in the top 10 in the Miss America 1991 pageant. Her scholarship award covered much of her undergraduate education.

After graduating from Liberty University in 1993 with a degree in Business Management, magna cum laude, Bream moved to Tallahassee to attend law school at Florida State University.  She interned with Florida Congressman Bill McCollum, in the US House of Representatives. McCollum would later become the Florida Attorney General. While at law school at Florida State, she won the Miss Florida USA pageant (1995) and placed fourth in the Miss USA 1995 pageant. Again, her scholarship awards from Miss USA pageants paid for her law school education.

Career
After graduation with a JD degree with honors from Florida State University College of Law in 1996, Bream moved to Tampa, Florida and began her career as a lawyer specializing in race discrimination and sexual harassment. 

She eventually made a career change from the legal profession to pursue a career in television news.

In 2001, she moved to Charlotte, North Carolina, becoming the evening and late-night news reporter for the CBS affiliate, WBTV. In 2004, after three years at WBTV, Bream joined Washington D.C.'s NBC affiliate WRC-TV. At WRC-TV, she was a weekend anchor and covered general assignments.

While at WRC-TV, Bream met Brit Hume, who was the managing editor of the Fox News Channel's Washington bureau. With his encouragement, she submitted audition tapes to Fox News. Bream joined the Fox News Channel in November 2007, and was based in the network's Washington, D.C. bureau.  She then became the anchor/host of Fox News @ Night.

On August 11, 2022, it was announced that Bream will become the permanent anchor of Fox News Sunday, beginning September 11, 2022, replacing Chris Wallace. 

Bream is the author of three books: Finding the Bright Side: The Art of Chasing What Matters, The Women of the Bible Speak: The Wisdom of 16 Women and Their Lessons for Today, and The Mothers and Daughters of the Bible Speak: Lessons on Faith from Nine Biblical Families. The book The Women of the Bible Speak: The Wisdom of 16 Women and Their Lessons for Today reached the number one spot on The New York Times Best Seller list.

Bream is Christian and is trained as a classical pianist. Bream's husband has a company that connects event planners with speakers, and is a brain tumor survivor.

References

External links
Shannon Bream Fox News biography 
 

Living people
American Christians
American television reporters and correspondents
American women television journalists
Florida lawyers
Florida State University College of Law alumni
Fox News people
Liberty University alumni
Miss America 1991 delegates
Miss USA 1995 delegates
Miss Virginia winners
People from Tallahassee, Florida
People from Tampa, Florida
21st-century American journalists
21st-century American women
1970 births